Mats Nyby (17 November 1946 – 11 May 2021) was a Finnish politician. A member of the Social Democratic Party of Finland (SDP), he served in Parliament from 1983 to 1999.

Nyby was heavily involved in the local politics of his hometown, Jakobstad.

Before moving into politics, Nyby was a schoolteacher in Jakobstad.

References

Social Democratic Party of Finland politicians
Members of the Parliament of Finland (1983–87)
Members of the Parliament of Finland (1987–91)
Members of the Parliament of Finland (1991–95)
Members of the Parliament of Finland (1995–99)
Finnish schoolteachers
People from Jakobstad
1946 births
2021 deaths